Orquesta Filarmónica de Málaga is an orchestra based in Málaga, Spain. It has been conducted by Edmon Colomer since September 2010.

References

External links
Official site

Spanish orchestras
Málaga